The Curupira is a mythological creature present in  Tupi-Guarani myths, such as those found in Paraguay, the Amazonia of Brasil and the northeast of Argentina.

The name comes from the Tupi language kuru'pir, meaning "covered in blisters". According to the cultural legends, this creature has bright red/orange hair, and resembles a man or a dwarf, but its feet are turned backwards. Curupira lives in the forest and uses its backward feet to create footprints that lead to its starting point, thus making hunters and travelers confused. Besides that, it can also create illusions and produce a sound that is like a high pitched whistle, in order to scare and drive its victim to madness. It is common to portray a Curupira riding a collared peccary, much like another Brazilian creature called Caipora.

A Curupira will prey on poachers and hunters that take more than they need of the forest, and he also attacks people who hunt animals that were taking care of their offspring. There are many different versions of the legend, and so the creature's appearance and habits may vary from each region in Brazil. However, Curupira is considered a nationwide folkloric figure.

In popular culture
A being called the Demon Curupira was featured in several episodes of the 1999 – 2002 television series BeastMaster. Played by Australian actress Emilie de Ravin, this Curupira, while still possessing the backwards feet, had the appearance of a young and deceptively sweet-faced blonde girl clad in green. She was a spirit of the forest and very capricious; she protected the animals, particularly tigers, and with a kiss she could drain humans of their lives, reducing their bodies to mere husks. She was an uneasy ally of the title character, Dar.

The Netflix Series of 2021 Invisible City features numerous characters of Brazilian Lore, including Curupira. Curupira, played by Fabio Lago, is portrayed as a homeless person who is actually an entity that guards and protects Brazilian forests, perceived by his backward feet, flaming head, and illusion-like high whistles that combine nature and human voices.

See also

Caipora
Cipitio
Headless Mule
Leshy, a similar forest-dwelling being from Slavic mythology
Mohan (legendary)
Puck
Saci
Uaica

Brazilian legendary creatures
Tupí legendary creatures
Brazilian folklore
Supernatural legends